Mehr Express is a passenger train operated daily by Pakistan Railways between Multan and Rawalpindi.

Route
 Multan Cantonment–Sher Shah Junction via Karachi–Peshawar Railway Line
 Sher Shah Junction–Kot Addu Junction via Sher Shah–Kot Addu Branch Line
 Kot Addu Junction–Basal Junction via Kotri–Attock Railway Line
 Basal Junction–Golra Sharif Junction via Khushalgarh–Kohat–Thal Railway
 Golra Sharif Junction–Rawalpindi via Karachi–Peshawar Railway Line

Station stops

Equipment
The train offers both AC Standard and economy accommodations.

Incidents
 Three people were killed when the Rawalpindi bound Mehr Express hit a vehicle at a level crossing in Hatar Phatak near Fateh Jang 15 September 2016.

References

Named passenger trains of Pakistan
Passenger trains in Pakistan